Daniel Ignacio Malhue Toro (born February 13, 1995) is a Chilean footballer who last played for Chilean Segunda División side Rodelindo Román.

Career
After playing for Deportes Temuco at the Chilean Primera División, on 2019 he joined Rodelindo Román at the Chilean Tercera B, the fifth category of the Chilean football. After two years at amateur leagues, along with Rodelindo Román he got promotion to the Chilean Segunda División for the 2021 season.

Personal life
Malhue is the brother-in-law of the Chile international footballer Arturo Vidal, since he is married to his younger sister, Victoria, with whom he has a son.

Honours
Rodelindo Román
 Tercera B: 2019

References

External links
 
 
 Daniel Malhue at playmakerstats.com (English version of ceroacero.es)

1995 births
Living people
Chilean people of Mapuche descent
Mapuche sportspeople
Footballers from Santiago
Chilean footballers
Colo-Colo B footballers
Colo-Colo footballers
Trasandino footballers
Coquimbo Unido footballers
Deportes Temuco footballers
Rodelindo Román footballers
Segunda División Profesional de Chile players
Chilean Primera División players
Primera B de Chile players
Association football forwards
Indigenous sportspeople of the Americas
20th-century Mapuche people
21st-century Mapuche people